Two ships of the Royal Navy have been named HMS Belfast after the capital city of Northern Ireland:

 The first  is a  light cruiser launched in 1938 preserved as a museum ship in London.
 The second  will be the third planned Type 26 frigate.

Battle honours
 Arctic 1943
 North Cape 1943
 Normandy 1944
 Korea 1950–52

Royal Navy ship names